Chloride is an unincorporated community in Sierra County, in the U.S. state of New Mexico. The community is located at the confluence of Chloride Creek with Mineral Creek. Most of the old mine workings are to the west, along Chloride Creek. Winston is approximately two miles to the east.

History
Chloride had its start in 1881 as a mining community when chlorargyrite (silver chloride) ore was discovered along the streambanks. A post office was established at Chloride in 1881, and remained in operation until 1956.

Education
Truth or Consequences Municipal Schools is the school district for the entire county. Truth or Consequences Middle School and Hot Springs High School, both in Truth or Consequences, are the district's secondary schools.

References

External links
Chloride on the Sierra County Tourism website
Pioneer Store Museum website

Unincorporated communities in Sierra County, New Mexico
Unincorporated communities in New Mexico